James Powers Moody (September 2, 1935March 22, 2019) was an American economist and Democratic politician.  He served five terms as the U.S. representative for Wisconsin's 5th congressional district (1983–1993). At the time, the 5th congressional district comprised the north half of Milwaukee County, including much of the city of Milwaukee.  Earlier in his career, he represented downtown Milwaukee in the Wisconsin State Senate and Assembly.

Background 
Moody was born in Richlands, Virginia; he graduated from Anglo American High School in Athens, Greece, in 1953 and earned his bachelor's degree from Haverford College in 1957. After two years of financial work on Wall Street, he became the CARE representative in Yugoslavia. After two years in Yugoslavia, he was assigned by CARE to Iran to lead a special feeding program assisting hospitals and schools and direct periodic earthquake relief.

During the early Peace Corps period he set up the agency's first programs in Pakistan and Bangladesh—the first two Peace Corps programs in Continental Asia. His responsibilities included negotiating the country-PC agreements and matching volunteers with their assignments.

He returned to Washington, D.C., for the next year as Pak desk officer, then became the loan officer for the USAID capital development program for Southeast Asia. After two years at USAID he earned an MPA at Harvard's John F. Kennedy School of Government. He then earned a Ph.D. in economics at the University of California, Berkeley, after which he was employed as an Assistant Professor of Economics at the University of Wisconsin–Milwaukee. He also taught occasional courses at the University of Wisconsin–Madison.

Political career
Taking leave from university teaching, Moody was elected to the Wisconsin State Assembly in 1976, then was elected to the State Senate in 1978,  where among his contributions were bills that deregulated monopoly truck hauling in the state and ended the commitment to build a major freeway through Milwaukee's lakefront park. He was also the floor leader in passing no-fault divorce legislation and decriminalization of homosexual activities.

In 1982, he was elected to the United States Congress to represent Wisconsin's 5th congressional district, serving five terms through 1992. In Congress he was elected by his peers to the House Ways & Means Committee and there assigned to the International Trade and Health/Medicare subcommittees. Among his bills he sponsored or co-sponsored was legislation for single-payer universal health care, wilderness preservation, pro-competition truck hauling, as well as legislation to prevent federal start-up employment incentives to be used for strike breaking. While in Congress he co-founded the organization that became the National Security Archive Project which continues today as a major force for transparency in federal government actions, especially overseas. Also, based on his experience in Bangladesh, he co-founded the Congressional support coalition for International Family Planning (then a very embroiled issue strongly opposed by President Reagan). His 1992 race for the U.S. Senate—based on the "up or out" mantra of the Peace Corps—did not bring victory.

Post-congressional career
Following the November 1992 election Moody served as the deputy director of the team preparing President-elect Bill Clinton's first federal budget (labeled "Eat Your Broccoli First"). In 1994 he taught healthcare economics at the Medical College of Wisconsin and graduate level economics at the Maryland School of Public Policy.

In 1995 Moody became the Vice President and Chief Financial Officer of the UN agency International Fund for Agricultural Development, which focuses on raising productivity and living standards in the agricultural sectors of developing countries. Moody administered the agency's annual budget of $50 million and managed $25+ million of the agency's assets and investment portfolio.

In 1997, Moody became President and CEO of InterAction, a D.C.-based coalition of American non-profit organizations. In 2000 he became a Senior Financial Advisor at Morgan Stanley and in 2005 he moved to Merrill Lynch as Financial Advisor and Vice President. In November, 2012 he became an Investment Advisor Representative Associate at Oppenheimer.

He was a board member of the National Iranian American Council (NIAC).

Moody was married to Janice Boettcher and had a son and daughter. He was fluent in Greek, Spanish, Serbo-Croatian, Persian and French.

Moody died at a hospital in Maryland on March 22, 2019 at the age of 83.

References

External links

Jim Moody, Wisconsin Historical Society 

1935 births
2019 deaths
American expatriates in Greece
American expatriates in Iran
American expatriates in Pakistan
American expatriates in Yugoslavia
Democratic Party members of the United States House of Representatives from Wisconsin
Haverford College alumni
Harvard Kennedy School alumni
Democratic Party members of the Wisconsin State Assembly
Peace Corps volunteers
People from Richlands, Virginia
Politicians from Milwaukee
University of California, Berkeley alumni
University of Wisconsin–Milwaukee faculty
Democratic Party Wisconsin state senators